Biathlon Australia (formerly Australian Biathlon Association) is the national governing body that oversees the Winter Olympic sport of Biathlon in Australia, in both its winter and summer forms. It is affiliated with the International Biathlon Union and the Australian Olympic Committee. It is based at Mount Hotham, in Victoria, Australia.

History and general information 
The Australian Biathlon Association began in the 1970s as the North East Victoria Biathlon Association, it has remained the national governing body for the sport of biathlon in Australia, evolving to become the Victorian Biathlon Association, then the Australian/Victorian Biathlon Association in the early 1980s, and is now the Australian Biathlon Association, reflecting its membership base and unitary model of governance.

Australia first sent a participant to the Winter Olympic Games at Sarajevo in 1984 (Andrew Paul, VIC) and the first woman biathlete Olympian was Kerryn Rim (NE VIC), Australia's highest-placed Olympic performer, finishing 8th in Women 15 km Individual (Distance) race in 1994. In 2006, Cameron Morton represented Australia at the Torino (ITA) Winter Olympic Games, in 2010, Alex Almoukouv represented Australia at Vancouver(CAN) Winter Olympic Games and in 2014 at Sochi (RUS), the representatives were Alex Almoukouv and Lucy Glanville. 

In 2016–2017, the ABA undertook the largest redevelopment of the Whiskey Flat range at Mount Hotham, to allow 15 lanes of participants at one time. The 15 lanes were ready for the 2017 Australian Winter season of biathlon, and at the Australian Biathlon Championships in August 2017, the range was officially named the Hotham Biathlon Arena, by Ms Danielle Green former MP, Parliamentary Secretary for Regional Victoria and Parliamentary Secretary for Tourism and Major Events. Biathlon upgrade to facilities was also undertaken in 2017 at SSAA Range in Wodonga and further upgrades to facilities have more recently taken place in NSW at the Perisher Laser Biathlon Range, the Anzac Rifle Range and Jindabyne Sport and Recreation Centre. These projects are part of the Victorian Government Shooting Sports Facilities Program and the NSW Government's Community Facilities upgrade projects. The upgrade to the Perisher Laser Range was funded by SportAUS.

Biathlon Australia together with a range of biathlon organisations in NSW, Victoria, ACT and QLD, are responsible for the development of biathlon at all levels in Australia, from grass roots to elite to Masters/Veterans. These activities range from laser biathlon for Under 12's to sending athletes to International Biathlon Union events during the IBU winter season, plus developing coaches through attendance at the IBU Coach Seminars each year, along with sending developing athletes and coaches to specialist IBU Development Camps each year.

Structure 
The Australian Biathlon Association has operates as a one member one vote organisation, regardless of state/territory of residence. There are several regional branches and Clubs around Australia, made up of members resident in the area. In other states, there are recognised State Sporting Organisations, most notably in ACT and NSW. In 2022, the various biathlon organisations in Australia are embarking on a unification journey which is aimed to result in a one sport/one management membership and sport structure. 

State firearms legislation drive much of the summer training and events for biathlon which leads up to peak State and ABA events at the Hotham Biathlon Arena in winter each year.  There is an increasing participation in summer biathlon events across Australia including the Hotham Biathlon Arena (VIC), Canberra Rifle Club (ACT), SSAA Wodonga (VIC), Anzac Rifle Range (NSW).

See also

References

External links 
 

Sports governing bodies in Australia
Biathlon organizations